Sardarabad may refer to:

Places
Sardarabad, Chaharmahal and Bakhtiari, Iran
Sardarabad, East Azerbaijan, Iran
Sardarabad, Gilan, Iran
Sardarabad, Hamadan, Iran
Sardarabad, Razan, Hamadan Province, Iran
Sardarabad, Kermanshah, Iran
Sardarabad, Andika, Khuzestan Province, Iran
Sardarabad, Shushtar, Khuzestan Province, Iran
Sardarabad, Delfan, Lorestan Province, Iran
Sardarabad, Khorramabad, Lorestan Province, Iran
Sardarabad, Markazi, Iran
Sardarabad, North Khorasan, Iran
Sardarabad, West Azerbaijan, Iran
Sardarabad Rural District, in Khuzestan Province, Iran

Media
Sardarabad (weekly), Armenian weekly published in Spanish and Armenian in Buenos Aires, Argentina

See also
 Sardarapat (disambiguation), places in Armenia